Lt-Colonel Ahmadu G. Hussaini was a Military Administrator of Adamawa State between August 1998 and May 1999 during the transitional regime of General Abdulsalami Abubakar, handing over to the elected civilian governor Boni Haruna at the start of the Nigerian Fourth Republic.
He was required to retire, as were all previous military administrators, in June 1999.

References

Nigerian Army officers
Living people
Nigerian Muslims
Governors of Adamawa State
1958 births